Tau tubulin kinase 1 is a protein that in humans is encoded by the TTBK1 gene.

References

Further reading